The Louisiana Ragin' Cajuns football statistical leaders are individual statistical leaders of the Louisiana Ragin' Cajuns football program in various categories, including passing, rushing, receiving, total offense, defensive statistics, and kicking. Within those areas, the lists identify single-game, single-season, and career leaders. The Ragin' Cajuns represent the University of Louisiana at Lafayette in the NCAA's Sun Belt Conference.

Although Louisiana began competing in intercollegiate football in 1902, the school's official record book considers the "modern era" to have begun in 1949. Records from before this year are often incomplete and inconsistent, and they are generally not included in these lists.

These lists are dominated by more recent players for several reasons:
 Since 1949, seasons have increased from 10 games to 11 and then 12 games in length.
 The NCAA didn't allow freshmen to play varsity football until 1972 (with the exception of the World War II years), allowing players to have four-year careers.
 Bowl games only began counting toward single-season and career statistics in 2002. The Ragin' Cajuns have played in nine bowl games since this decision (all since 2011). This has given many recent players an extra game to accumulate statistics. While two of Louisiana's nine bowl appearances are not recognized by the NCAA due to sanctions imposed by that body, individual statistics from those games are recognized by the NCAA, provided that the players involved were not declared ineligible.
 The Sun Belt Conference has held a championship game since 2018. The Ragin' Cajuns qualified for the first four editions (2018–2021), although the 2020 edition was not played due to COVID-19 issues. This has given players in those seasons an extra game in which to accumulate statistics.
 Due to COVID-19 disruptions throughout college football, the NCAA ruled that the 2020 season would not count against the eligibility of any football player, giving every player who participated in that season the chance for five years of eligibility instead of the normal four.

These lists are updated through the 2021 season.

Passing

Passing yards

Passing touchdowns

Rushing

Rushing yards

Rushing touchdowns

Receiving

Receptions

Receiving yards

Receiving touchdowns

Total offense
Total offense is the sum of passing and rushing statistics. It does not include receiving or returns.

Total offense yards

Touchdowns responsible for
"Touchdowns responsible for" is the official NCAA term for combined passing and rushing touchdowns. The 2021 Louisiana media guide does not list leaders in this statistic over any time frame, although past editions have done so.

Defense

Interceptions

Tackles

Sacks

Kicking

Field goals made

Field goal percentage

References

Louisiana